Paleopsilopterus is an extinct genus of giant flightless predatory birds within Cariamiformes. It is usually attributed to the subfamily Psilopterinae of the family Phorusrhacidae, or "terror birds", though doubts about such an identity have arisen multiple times. It lived around 53 to 50 million years ago (Itaboraian) in Brazil, during the Early Eocene. The only known species is Paleopsilopterus itaboraiensis. Fossils of Paleopsilopterus have been found in the Itaboraí Formation at São José de Itaborai in Rio de Janeiro state.

References

External links 
 Genus Taxonomy

Phorusrhacidae
Prehistoric bird genera
Extinct flightless birds
Eocene birds of South America
Ypresian life
Itaboraian
Paleogene Brazil
Fossils of Brazil
Fossil taxa described in 1985